Flame and the Flesh is a 1954  American drama film  directed by Richard Brooks and starring Lana Turner, Pier Angeli, Carlos Thompson and Bonar Colleano. It was made and distributed by MGM and produced by Joe Pasternak from a screenplay by Helen Deutsch based on the 1924 novel French Naples au baiser de feu by Auguste Bailly. The music score was by Nicholas Brodszky and the cinematography by Christopher Challis. It was shot at M-G-M British Studios near London and on location around Positano and Naples in Southern Italy. The film's sets were designed by the art director Alfred Junge.

Plot
Madeline Duvain is evicted from her apartment for non-payment of rent. She wanders the street, where musician Ciccio Duvario takes pity on her and invites her home. The manipulative Madeline soon begins to take advantage of his kindness.

Ciccio works at a nightclub where his roommate Nino is a very popular singer. Lisa, the club owner's daughter, is in love with Nino, who has been seeing a married woman.

Nino realizes that Lisa would be good for him, so they set a wedding date. But when he meets Madeline, the attraction is immediate. They run off together. Ciccio vows to find and kill them.

Madeline grows frustrated when Nino has difficulty finding work. She seduces a club owner into hiring Nino to sing. Nino finally understands the kind of woman she is, striking the club owner and slapping her. Madeline knows too late that she loves him as Nino leaves her forever, hoping that Ciccio will forgive him and Lisa will take him back.

Background and production
The film is a remake of a 1938 French film, Naples au baiser de feu, also known in the USA as The Kiss of Fire, itself a remake of a 1925 French silent film of the same name. Both earlier versions were based on the same novel.

The film was shot in London and Naples, Italy.

In this film, Lana Turner, famously blonde, appears as a brunette.

Cast
 Lana Turner as Madeline  
 Pier Angeli as Lisa  
 Carlos Thompson as Nino  
 Bonar Colleano as Ciccio  
 Charles Goldner as Mondari  
 Peter Illing as Peppe  
 Rosalie Crutchley as Francesca  
 Marne Maitland as Filiberto  
 Eric Pohlmann as Marina Proprietor
 Catharina Ferraz as Dressmaker 
 Alex Gallier as	Playboy

Reception
According to MGM records, the film earned $1,329,000 in the US and Canada and $965,000 elsewhere resulting in a loss of $171,000.

References

External links

 
 

1954 films
1954 drama films
American drama films
Films set in Italy
Metro-Goldwyn-Mayer films
Films based on French novels
American remakes of French films
Films directed by Richard Brooks
1950s English-language films
Films produced by Joe Pasternak
Films shot at MGM-British Studios
Films shot in Italy
1950s American films